Henry Wansbrough  (born Joseph Wansbrough, 1934) is an English biblical scholar, Catholic priest, and monk of Ampleforth Abbey. From 1990 to 2004, he served as Master of St Benet's Hall, Oxford.

Biography
Born as Joseph Wansbrough on 9 October 1934 in London, England, Henry Wansbrough is Cathedral Prior of Norwich (2004–present), Magister Scholarum of the English Benedictine Congregation (2001–present), member of the Pontifical Biblical Commission (1997–2007), Chairman of the Trustees of the Catholic Biblical Association (1996–present), and Emeritus Member of the Faculty of Theology in the University of Oxford (1990–present). He is Alexander Jones Professor of Biblical Studies within the Department of Theology, Philosophy and Religious studies at Liverpool Hope University. From 1990 until 2004 he was Master of St Benet's Hall, the Benedictine permanent private hall of the University of Oxford.

While studying at the University of Oxford he was examined by novelist C.S. Lewis.

He was an early advocate for the acceptance of Protestant scholars, persuading the editors of the Catholic Commentary on Holy Scripture to remove asterisks highlighting the contributions of Protestant scholars in the second edition, arguing that “we can learn from one another”.

He was General Editor of the New Jerusalem Bible and the Revised New Jerusalem Bible. He has written twenty books, more than sixty articles, around ninety book reviews, an edition of the Synoptic Gospels, with an accompanying textbook, for A-Level students, and more than fifty electronic booklets, essays, and lectures, as well as editing, co-editing, and translating other volumes.

He produces the "Wednesday Word" a not-for-profit collaborative charitable trust based at St Austin's Catholic Church, Wakefield, West Yorkshire which aims to spread the Sunday Gospel to families through primary schools and enriching the Home, School & Parish partnership.

He currently resides at Ampleforth Abbey, working as a religious studies teacher at Ampleforth College where he stays active by riding his scooter around the school. He also works as a house chaplain at St Oswald's boarding house.

See also
 English Benedictine Congregation

References

External links
 Home page at Ampleforth Abbey
 Home page at Oxford
 Home page at Darton, Longman & Todd
 

1934 births
Living people
20th-century British Roman Catholic theologians
Christian writers
Religion academics
21st-century British Roman Catholic theologians
20th-century English Roman Catholic priests
21st-century English Roman Catholic priests
English Benedictines
English classical scholars
British biblical scholars
Translators of the Bible into English
Masters of St Benet's Hall, Oxford
Place of birth missing (living people)
20th-century translators
20th-century English male writers